Muḥammad ibn ‘Ajlān ibn Rumaythah ibn Abī Numayy al-Ḥasanī was Emir of Mecca from 1395 to 1396.

Muhammad assumed the Emirate on Thursday, 8 Shawwal 797 AH (29 July 1395) following the death of his brother Ali ibn Ajlan. He remained in the post until the arrival of Hasan ibn Ajlan in late Rabi al-Thani 798 AH (February 1396).

Notes

References

Sharifs of Mecca
14th-century Arabs